George White Dick  (12 June 1921 – 7 September 1960) was a Scottish Guardsman, B.A.O.R. cruiserweight boxing champion, and professional football player and manager.

After leaving the army, while making up his mind whether to take a letter of recommendation to a London club, Dick worked as a waiter in Blackpool. He asked Joe Smith, Blackpool F.C. manager, for a trial in August 1946, and within ten minutes was signed on. He played in the 1948 FA Cup Final for Blackpool against Manchester United. He also wrote training manuals and was one of the first qualified FA coaches. He managed Galatasaray in Turkey on two occasions. His life was cut short when he was killed in a road accident in 1960.

Football career

Playing 
Dick began his professional career in 1946 with Blackpool. He made his debut for the club in their tenth league game of the 1946–47 campaign, against Arsenal at Bloomfield Road on 5 October 1946. Wearing the number 8 shirt, he scored the hosts' second goal (Stan Mortensen scored the first).

Dick went on to make a further 30 league and one FA Cup appearances that season. He scored eleven goals in the league, and finished second-top scorer behind Mortensen. Aside from his debut goal, his other strikes came against Manchester United (home, 3–1, 19 October); Stoke City (away, 1–4, 7 December); Huddersfield Town (home, 2–1, 28 December); Derby County (home, 2–1, 1 February 1947); Preston North End (two goals) (home, 4–0, 15 February); Chelsea (two goals) (away, 4–1, 8 March); and Sheffield United (two goals) (home, 4–2, 15 March).

In the 1947–48 season, Dick made sixteen league appearances, scoring two goals. Both goals came in a 5–0 victory over Everton at the seaside on 3 January 1948, which was George Farrow's last game for Blackpool. He also played in each of Blackpool's six FA Cup ties, including their unsuccessful appearance in the final against Manchester United, in what proved to be his final game for the club. He scored one of their goals in the 4–0 victory over Leeds United in the third round.

In August 1948, Dick was sold to West Ham for £7,000. He remained with the Hammers for a season, at the end of which he moved north to sign for Carlisle United. Two years later, in October 1951, he joined Stockport County for a short spell.

In late 1951 he signed for Workington. He retired, as captain, from the playing side of the game two years later.

Coaching 
Ghent (Belgium), U.S. Army (Germany), Galatasaray, B.1909 (Denmark)

1953–55 July 1953 Royal Racing Club de Ghent (Belgium)

1956 U.S. army coach based in Germany, 5 August travelled for interview for position with Galatasaray

1957 Boldklubben.1909 Denmark

1958–59 Galatasaray

1959–60 Boldklubben 1909 Denmark, won championship Danish Champions 1959

References

External links 
 George Dick – West Ham career stats
 
 Blackpool 1948 F.A. Cup Final line-up programme image

1921 births
1960 deaths
Scottish footballers
Scottish male boxers
Blackpool F.C. players
West Ham United F.C. players
Carlisle United F.C. players
Stockport County F.C. players
Workington A.F.C. players
Galatasaray S.K. (football) managers
Road incident deaths in the United Kingdom
Scots Guards soldiers
Boldklubben 1909 managers
Footballers from West Lothian
English Football League players
Scottish football managers
Expatriate football managers in Belgium
Expatriate football managers in Turkey
Scottish expatriate football managers
Association football forwards
FA Cup Final players
K.R.C. Gent managers